Alexandre-Charles-Albert-Joseph Renard (7 June 1906, Avelin, Nord – 8 October 1983, Paris) was a French Roman Catholic Cardinal and Archbishop of Lyon. He was ordained on 12 July 1931 in Lille.

Life and career 
He taught at Marcq College, Baraeul in 1933–1936, and then taught at the seminary of Haubourdin until 1938. He continued his teaching through the Second World War at the Catholic University of Lille until 1943, and also did pastoral work in the diocese of Lille until 1947.

On 19 August 1953 Pope Pius XII appointed Renard Bishop of Versailles, and on 28 May 1967 he was appointed to the metropolitan see of Lyon by Pope Paul VI. He was created Cardinal-Priest of SS. Trinità al Monte Pincio on 26 June 1967 by Pope Paul.

He took part in both conclaves of 1978 that elected Pope John Paul I and Pope John Paul II. He retired as Archbishop at the age of 75. Cardinal Renard died 1983 after a surgery, at the age of 77.

References

External links 
 The Cardinals of the Holy Roman Church

 
 
 

1906 births
1983 deaths
People from Nord (French department)
20th-century French cardinals
Participants in the Second Vatican Council
Archbishops of Lyon
Bishops of Versailles
Cardinals created by Pope Paul VI